This is a list of referendums related to the European Union, or referendums related to the European Communities, which were predecessors of the European Union. Since 1972, a total of 48 referendums have been held by EU member states, candidate states, and their territories, with several additional referendums held in countries outside the EU. The referendums have been held most commonly on the subject of whether to become a member of European Union as part of the accession process, although the EU does not require any candidate country to hold a referendum to approve membership or as part of treaty ratification.  Other EU-related referendums have been held on the adoption of the euro and on participation in other EU-related policies.

The United Kingdom is the only country as an EU member state to have held referendums on continued membership of the European Union and its antecedent organisation, the European Communities. In the first referendum in 1975, continued membership of what was then the European Communities (which included the European Economic Community, often referred to as the Common Market in the UK) was approved by 67.2% of voters, while in its second referendum in 2016 voters voted by 51.9% to leave the European Union, effectively reversing the result of the first referendum.

Greenland, an autonomous territory of Denmark, voted to leave the EC in a referendum in 1982 by 53% of voters.

Summary

EC enlargement of 1973 

In 1972, four countries held referendums on the subject of the 1973 enlargement of the European Communities.

  — 1972 French European Communities enlargement referendum, 23 April 1972, 68.3% in favour, turnout 60.5%
 Before allowing the four new candidate member states to join the European Communities, founding member France held a referendum that approved this. Following the French approval, three of the four candidate states (Ireland, Denmark and Norway) likewise held referendums on the issue of joining the European Communities.  The United Kingdom did not hold a referendum before joining.
  — a referendum to approve the Third Amendment of the Constitution of Ireland, 10 May 1972, 83.1% in favour, turnout 70.9%
  — 1972 Norwegian European Communities membership referendum, 25 September 1972, 53.5% against, turnout 79%
 Following the rejection by the Norwegian electorate, Norway did not join.
  — 1972 Danish European Communities membership referendum, 2 October 1972, 63.3% in favour, turnout 90.1%

Denmark, Ireland, and the United Kingdom were admitted as members of the EC, acceding on 1 January 1973.

United Kingdom's European Communities membership, 1975 

  — 1975 United Kingdom European Communities membership referendum, 5 June 1975, 67.2% in favour, turnout 64.0%
 The Conservative government of Edward Heath did not hold a referendum before the United Kingdom joined the European Communities in 1973. The Labour Party's manifesto for the 1974 general election included a pledge for an in-out referendum after a renegotiation of its membership. Accordingly, after Labour won under Harold Wilson, the referendum was held on whether to remain in the Communities after a renegotiation of its membership. The result was in favour of remaining.

Greenland's European Communities membership, 1982 

  — 1982 Greenlandic European Communities membership referendum, 23 February 1982, 53.0% against
 In 1973, Greenland joined the European communities as part of Denmark. However, after the establishment of home-rule and eurosceptic Siumut winning the 1979 Greenlandic parliamentary election, a referendum on membership was agreed upon, in which the voters rejected remaining part of the communities. This resulted in Greenland negotiating the terms of its separation from the EU, resulting in the Greenland Treaty, and Greenland's leaving the communities in 1985.

Single European Act 

Two referendums were held in EU countries to permit them to ratify the Single European Act.

  — 1986 Danish Single European Act referendum, 26 February 1986, 56.2% in favour, turnout 75.4%
  — a referendum to approve the Tenth Amendment of the Constitution of Ireland, 26 May 1987, 69.9% in favour, turnout 44.1%

Maastricht Treaty 

  — 1989 Italian advisory referendum, 18 May 1989, 88.1% in favour, turnout 81.0%
 Before the negotiations on the treaty of Maastricht began, Italy held a consultative referendum to give the European Parliament a popular mandate to elaborate a future European Constitution. After the treaty was signed, three countries held referendums on its ratification.
  — a referendum to approve the Eleventh Amendment of the Constitution of Ireland, 18 June 1992, 69.1% in favour, turnout 57.3%
  — 1992 French Maastricht Treaty referendum, 20 September 1992, 51.0% in favour, turnout 69.7%
  — The 1992 Danish Maastricht Treaty referendum, 2 June 1992, 50.7% against, turnout 83.1%
 In Denmark, two referendums were held before the treaty of Maastricht passed. The first one rejected the treaty.
  — The 1993 Danish Maastricht Treaty referendum, 18 May 1993, 56.7% in favour, turnout 86.5%
 After the defeat of the treaty in the first referendum, Denmark negotiated and received four opt-outs from portions of the treaty: Economic and Monetary Union, Union Citizenship, Justice and Home Affairs, and Common Defence. The second referendum approved the treaty amended with the opt-outs.

EU enlargement of 1995 

In 1994, four countries, and one dependency, held referendums on membership of the EU, resulting in the 1995 enlargement of the European Union.

  — 1994 Austrian European Union membership referendum, 12 June 1994, 66.6% in favour, turnout 82.3%
  — 1994 Finnish European Union membership referendum, 16 October 1994, 56.9% in favour, turnout 70.8%
  — 1994 Swedish European Union membership referendum, 13 November 1994, 52.3% in favour, turnout 83.3%
  — 1994 Ålandic European Union membership referendum, 20 November 1994, 73.6% in favour, turnout 49.1%
 The Åland Islands, a semi-autonomous dependency of Finland, also voted on their accession to the European Union. The favourable vote meant that EU law would apply also to the Åland Islands.
  — 1994 Norwegian European Union membership referendum, 28 November 1994, 52.2% against, turnout 89.0%
 For the second time, Norwegian voters rejected the Norwegian government's proposal to join the EU.

Austria, Sweden, and Finland were admitted as members of the EU, acceding on 1 January 1995.

Treaty of Amsterdam, 1998 

Two countries held referendums on the ratification of the treaty of Amsterdam.

  — a referendum to approve the Eighteenth Amendment of the Constitution of Ireland, 22 May 1998, 61.7% in favour, turnout 56.2%
  — 1998 Danish Amsterdam Treaty referendum, 28 May 1998, 55.1% in favour, turnout 76.2%

Treaty of Nice, 2001 

  — a referendum to approve the Twenty-fourth Amendment of the Constitution Bill, 2001 (Ireland), 7 June 2001, 53.9% against, turnout 34.8%
 In 2001, Irish voters rejected the Treaty of Nice, in the so-called "Nice I referendum".
  — a referendum to approve the Twenty-sixth Amendment of the Constitution of Ireland, 19 October 2002, 62.9% in favour, turnout 49.5%
 In the so-called "Nice II referendum" in 2002, statements on Ireland not having to join a common defence policy and affirming the right to decide on enhanced cooperation in the national parliament were stressed in a special document, resulting in a favourable vote.

EU enlargement of 2004 

The 2004 enlargement of the European Union involved ten candidate states, eight from Central and Eastern Europe, and the Mediterranean islands of Malta and Cyprus. In 2003, referendums on joining the EU were held in all these nations except Cyprus.

  — 2003 Maltese European Union membership referendum, 8 March 2003, 53.6% in favour, turnout 90.9%
  — 2003 Slovenian European Union and NATO membership referendum, 23 March 2003, 89.6% in favour, turnout 60.2%
  — 2003 Hungarian European Union membership referendum, 12 April 2003, 83.8% in favour, turnout 45.6%
  — 2003 Lithuanian European Union membership referendum, 10–11 May 2003, 91.9% in favour, turnout 63.4%
  — 2003 Slovak European Union membership referendum, 16–17 May 2003, 93.7% in favour, turnout 52.1%
  — 2003 Polish European Union membership referendum, 7–8 June 2003, 77.5% in favour, turnout 58.9%
  — 2003 Czech European Union membership referendum, 13–14 June 2003, 77.3% in favour, turnout 55.2%
  — 2003 Estonian European Union membership referendum, 14 September 2003, 66.8% in favour, turnout 64.1%
  — 2003 Latvian European Union membership referendum, 20 September 2003, 67.5% in favour, turnout 71.5%

Since the results were in favourable in all cases, all ten candidate countries were admitted as members of the EU, acceding on 1 May 2004.

Euro 

Denmark and the United Kingdom received opt-outs from the Maastricht Treaty and do not have to join the euro unless they choose to do so; Sweden has not received an opt-out, yet deliberately does not live up to the requirements for joining. Two referendums have been held on the issue, both of which rejected accession.

  — 2000 Danish euro referendum, 28 September 2000, 53.2% against, turnout 87.6%
  — 2003 Swedish euro referendum, 14 September 2003, 55.9% against, turnout 82.6%

European Constitution, 2005 

Several member states used or intended to use referendums to ratify the Treaty establishing a Constitution for Europe (TCE).

  — 2005 Spanish European Constitution referendum, 20 February 2005, 81.8% in favour, turnout 41.8%
  — 2005 French European Constitution referendum, 29 May 2005, 54.7% against, turnout 69.4%
  — 2005 Dutch European Constitution referendum, 1 June 2005, 61.5% against, turnout 63.3%
  — 2005 Luxembourgian European Constitution referendum, 10 July 2005, 56.5% in favour, turnout 90.4%

Referendums were planned, but not held, in:

  — Czech European Constitution referendum
  — Danish European Constitution referendum
  — Irish European Constitution referendum
  — Polish European Constitution referendum
  — Portuguese European Constitution referendum
  — United Kingdom European Constitution referendum

Treaty of Lisbon 

Only one member state, Ireland, obliged by their constitution, decided on ratification of the Treaty of Lisbon through a referendum.

  — a referendum to approve the Twenty-eighth Amendment of the Constitution Bill, 2008 (Ireland), 12 June 2008, 53.2% against, turnout 53.1%
 In 2008, Irish voters rejected the Treaty of Lisbon.
  — a referendum to approve the Twenty-eighth Amendment of the Constitution of Ireland, 2 October 2009, 67.1% in favour, turnout 59.0%
 After the first vote by Ireland on the Lisbon Treaty, the European Council and the Irish Government released separate documents, referred to as the "Irish Guarantees", that stated the other member countries would not use the possibility in the Treaty to diminish the number of permanent commissioners in favour of a rotating system with fewer commissioners, and not threaten Ireland's military neutrality and rules on abortion. With these assurances, the Irish approved the unchanged Lisbon Treaty in a second referendum.

EU enlargement of 2013 

  — 2012 Croatian European Union membership referendum, 22 January 2012, 66.7% in favour, turnout 43.5%

Croatia was admitted as a member of the EU, acceding on 1 July 2013.

European Fiscal Compact, 2012 

  — a referendum to approve the Thirtieth Amendment of the Constitution of Ireland, 31 May 2012, 60.4% in favour, turnout 50.5%

San Marino membership application 
A referendum was held in San Marino on whether the country should submit an application to join the European Union as a full member state.
  – 2013 Sammarinese referendum, 20 October 2013, 50.28% in favour, turnout 43.38% (quorum of 32% of registered voters in favour not met.)

Unified Patent Court 

The Unified Patent Court is a proposed court between several EU member states, that, inter alia, is to be constituted for litigation related to the European Union patent.

  — 2014 Danish Unified Patent Court membership referendum, 25 May 2014, 62.5% in favour, turnout 55.9%
  — The ratification of Ireland requires a referendum. Such a referendum has not been announced.

Greek bailout referendum, 2015 

  — 2015 Greek bailout referendum, 5 July 2015, 61.3% against, turnout 62.5%
 A referendum on the bailout conditions in the Greek government-debt crisis. A majority of the voters rejected the bailout conditions. However, shortly afterwards the government accepted a bailout with even harsher conditions than the ones rejected by the voters.

Danish EU opt-out referendum, 2015 

  The 2015 Danish European Union opt-out referendum, 53.1% against, turnout 72.0%
 The referendum was held to decide on converting the opt-out from participation in the area of Justice and Home Affairs area into an opt-in: the possibility for the Danes to decide on a case-by-case basis. The voters rejected the proposal.

Dutch Ukraine–European Union Association Agreement referendum, 2016 

  — 2016 Dutch Ukraine–European Union Association Agreement referendum, 6 April 2016, 61.0% against, turnout 32.2%
 A consultative referendum upon a request of 427,939 Dutch citizens, based on the Advisory Referendum Act 2015.

United Kingdom's European Union membership, 2016 

  — 2016 United Kingdom European Union membership referendum, 23 June 2016, 51.9% to leave, turnout 72.2%
 In February 2016, the Conservative government of David Cameron negotiated "a new settlement for Britain in the EU" which was then followed by a referendum on the UK's membership of the European Union in the United Kingdom and Gibraltar. The result was for the UK to leave the EU and the deal was discarded. The United Kingdom formally withdrew from the EU on 31 January 2020.

Hungarian migrant quota referendum, 2016 

  — 2016 Hungarian migrant quota referendum, 2 October 2016, 98.4% against, turnout 44.0%
 A referendum was held to decide whether Hungary should accept migrant quotas imposed by the EU without the National Assembly's approval or not. The turnout was too low to make the poll valid.

Danish EU opt-out referendum, 2022 
  – 2022 Danish European Union opt-out referendum, 1 June 2022, 66.8% in favour, turnout 65.7%
A referendum on the abolition of Denmark's opt-out from the European Union's defense cooperation.

Future EU enlargements 

Countries which seek to join the European Union in the future may hold a referendum as part of the accession process. In addition, Article 88-5 of the Constitution of France requires a referendum there to ratify any future accession treaty. Politicians in other existing members have proposed referendums in their states, particularly with reference to the accession of Turkey.

There is discussion amongst eurosceptic parties and movements across the EU to hold their own referendums on EU membership since the referendum in the UK.

Agreements between Switzerland and the EU 

  — 1972: Free trade agreement with the EC, 72.5% in favour
  — 1992: EEA Agreement with all EU member states and all EFTA member states as well as the European Communities, 50.3% against
  — 1997: Requiring the approval of a referendum and the Cantons to launch accession negotiations with the EU, 74.1% against
  — 2000: Bilateral I agreements with the EU, 67.2% in favour
  — 2001: Opening negotiations for EU membership, 76.8% against
  — 2005: Schengen Agreement and the Dublin Regulation, 54.6% in favour
  — 2005: Freedom of movement for workers, to include 10 new EU members, 56.0% in favour
  — 2006: Cohesion contribution of one billion for the ten new member states of the EU, 53.4% in favour
  — 2009: Freedom of movement for workers, to include two new EU members, 59.6% in favour
  — 2009: Introduction of biometric passports, as required by the Schengen acquis, 50.1% in favour
  — 2014: Freedom of movement for workers to be reduced, 50.3% in favour
  — 2020: Termination of the 1999 Agreement on the Free Movement of Persons, 61.7% against

Notes

References 
Footnotes

References

 
Lists of referendums